Lord Alwyne Compton (18 July 1825 – 4 April 1906) was an Anglican bishop in the late 19th and early 20th centuries.

Life and career
Compton was the fourth son of Spencer Compton, 2nd Marquess of Northampton, and was educated at Eton and Trinity College, Cambridge.  His first post was as Curate at Horsham, after which he was Rector of Castle Ashby, a post he held for 26 years. He was also Archdeacon of Oakham for the last four years of this period.  In 1879, he was appointed Dean of Worcester, and then in 1886 to the See of Ely, He held this position until 1905, when he resigned and retired to Canterbury, where he died the following year.

Lord Alwyne Compton was Lord High Almoner from 1882 to 1906.

On 28 August 1850 Lord Alwyne Compton married Florence Caroline Anderson (d.1918), eldest daughter of Robert Anderson, a Brighton clergyman, and his wife, the Hon. Caroline Dorothea Shore. They remained childless.

References

External links
 

1825 births
People from Northamptonshire
People educated at Eton College
Alumni of Trinity College, Cambridge
Bishops of Ely
Deans of Worcester
Archdeacons of Oakham
19th-century Church of England bishops
20th-century Church of England bishops
1906 deaths
Younger sons of marquesses
Alwyne